Clayton Hinkley (born 21 February 1989) is an Australian rules footballer who formerly played for the Fremantle Football Club. He was selected with the 24th selection in the 2007 AFL National Draft.

Hinkley was a member of Victoria Country's National Under 18s Championships side and co-captained North Ballarat in the TAC Cup A quick midfielder, Hinkley ranked equal second in the 20-metre sprints, third in the agility test and fourth in the shuttle run at the 2007 AFL Draft Camp.

Since 2008 he has played for Swan Districts in the WAFL when not selected to play in the AFL.

Hinkley was delisted from the Dockers on 7 September 2011, and played for Port Melbourne in the Victorian Football League in 2012 and 2013 before playing for the Warrack Eagles in the Wimmera Football League in 2014. Played with Birchip Bulls in practice match March 2021.

References

External links

1989 births
Living people
Fremantle Football Club players
Swan Districts Football Club players
Australian rules footballers from Victoria (Australia)
Greater Western Victoria Rebels players
Port Melbourne Football Club players